Marciana is a town and comune in the province of Livorno, Tuscany (Italy), located in the western Elba Island.

References

Elba